Play Motel is a 1979 Italian giallo film written and directed by Mario Gariazzo (credited as Roy Garrett) and starring Anna Maria Rizzoli and Ray Lovelock.

Play Motel was released on blu-ray in a region 1 release by Raro Video in August 2015. The release contains an extra feature of the hardcore inserts.

Plot  
Patrizia and Roberto, theatrical actors and spouses, after having stayed at the Play Motel, accidentally find a body in the trunk of their car. They leave the car at the scene and go to call the police, and when they arrive, they discover with amazement the removal of the body, which is then found in a completely different place: the police then discover that it was Maria Luisa Longhi, wife of Commendator Rinaldo Cortesi. At the request in particular of Patrizia, the two spouses improvise as investigators to help the police solve the case.

Cast 
 Anna Maria Rizzoli as Patrizia
 Ray Lovelock as  Roberto Vinci
 Mario Cutini as  Willy 
  Antonella Antinori as  Anna De Marchis 
 Patrizia Behn as  Maria Luisa Longhi
 Enzo Fisichella as  Commendator Rinaldo Cortesi 
 Marina Hedman as  Loredana Salvi 
 Marino Masé as Massimo (Max) Liguori
 Patrizia Webley as Valeria Marzotti
 Vittorio Ripamonti as  ing. Guido Toselli
 Anthony Steffen as  Commissioner De Santis 
 Mario Novelli as The Doorman

See also
 List of Italian films of 1979

References

External links

1970s crime thriller films
Giallo films
Films directed by Mario Gariazzo
1970s Italian-language films
1970s Italian films